The 1928 United States Senate special election in Illinois took place on November 6, 1928. The election was held due to the U.S. Senate's refusal to seat 1926 election winner, Republican Frank L. Smith, due to allegations of election fraud. The election saw the election of Republican Otis F. Glenn.

Election information
The primaries and general election coincided with those for federal elections (president and House) and those for state elections. Primaries were held April 10, 1928.

Democratic primary

Candidates
Anton Cermak, president of the Cook County Board of Commissioners
James O. Monroe, attorney and perennial candidate

Results

Republican primary

Candidates
Otis F. Glenn, former Illinois state senator
Frank L. Smith, unseated winner of 1926 U.S. Senate election

Campaign
The Illinois Republican primaries of 1928 were plagued with electoral violence, and were dubbed the "Pineapple Primary".

Chicago mayor William Hale Thompson backed Smith for Senate, while Charles S. Deneen, who held Illinois' other U.S. Senate seat, backed Glenn. Thompson and Deneen controlled rival factions of the state's Republican Party. Thompson's faction was vastly dominant at the time.

Results

General election

See also
1928 United States Senate elections

References

1928
Illinois
United States Senate
Illinois 1928
Illinois 1928
United States Senate 1928